Bryopsidella neglecta is a species of green alga.

External links
 Algaebase entry

Plants described in 1880
Bryopsidales